The house at 38–40 Webster Place in Brookline, Massachusetts, is a rare local example of transitional Greek Revival-Italianate styling.

Description and history 
The wood-framed -story two-family house was built c. 1855–56 as a rental property by either Bela Stoddard or his son George. It has a side-gable roof, with a single-story porch extending across the five-bay front facade. The walls under the porch are finished in flushboard, a Greek Revival feature, while the porch supports are Italianate in style.

The building was listed on the National Register of Historic Places on October 17, 1985.

See also
National Register of Historic Places listings in Brookline, Massachusetts

References

Houses in Brookline, Massachusetts
Italianate architecture in Massachusetts
Houses completed in 1855
National Register of Historic Places in Brookline, Massachusetts
Houses on the National Register of Historic Places in Norfolk County, Massachusetts
Greek Revival architecture in Massachusetts